Lilaste Station is a railway station on the Zemitāni–Skulte Railway in Latvia. It has a double-track line to Carnikava and a single-track line to Saulkrasti.

References 

Railway stations in Latvia